Surveyors Range is an Antarctican mountain range 30 miles (48 km) long, extending north along the east side of Starshot Glacier from the Thompson Mountain area to the glaciers terminus at the Ross Ice Shelf. Named by the New Zealand Geological Survey Antarctic Expedition (NZGSAE) (1960–61) for the early pioneering surveyors of New Zealand and present day equivalents in Great Britain who contributed to work carried out in this area by Captain P.J. Hunt, Royal Engineers.

Features
Geographical features include:

 Adams Peak
 Bieber Bench
 Bridge Pass
 Centaur Bluff
 Dickey Glacier
 Farmer Glacier
 Heale Peak
 Hermitage Peak
 Howard-Williams Point
 Jones Buttress
 Mansergh Snowfield
 Mount Hotine
 Mount Mathew
 Mount McKerrow
 Mount Ubique
 Starshot Glacier
 Thompson Mountain

References

Mountain ranges of the Ross Dependency
Transantarctic Mountains
Amundsen Coast